The Undercover Woman is a 1946 American comedy film directed by Thomas Carr, written by Sherman L. Lowe, Robert F. Metzler and Jerry Sackheim, and starring Stephanie Bachelor, Robert Livingston, Richard Fraser, Isabel Withers, Helene Heigh, Edythe Elliott and Elaine Lange. It was released on April 11, 1946, by Republic Pictures.

Plot

Cast   
Stephanie Bachelor as Marcia Conroy
Robert Livingston as Sheriff Don Long
Isabel Withers as Penny Davis
Helene Heigh as Laura Vixon
Edythe Elliott as Mrs. Grey
Elaine Lange as Juanita Gillette
John Dehner as Walter Hughes
Betty Blythe as Cissy Van Horne
Tom London as Lem Stone
Richard Fraser as Gregory Vixon
Larry J. Blake as Simon Gillette

References

External links 
 

1946 films
American comedy films
1946 comedy films
Republic Pictures films
Films directed by Thomas Carr
American black-and-white films
1940s English-language films
1940s American films